The A5 motorway of Slovenia is 79.6 km long. It begins at the Dragučova interchange on the A1 motorway north of Maribor and ends at the Hungarian border at Pince, continuing on in Hungary as the M70 motorway. It connects Maribor with Budapest.

The first section was completed in 2003, whilst the last section was opened for traffic in October 2008.

Junctions, exits and rest area

European Route(s)

External links
DARS, the national motorway operator of Slovenia.
Exit list of A5

Highways in Slovenia